Shawdhab Mawla Shakir was among Husayn ibn Ali's companion who was martyred at the Battle of Karbala.

Biography 
Shawdhab mentioned as the servant of Shakir ibn Abd Allah al-Hamdani al-Shakiri in some resource and others mentioned him as the servant of Abis ibn Abi Shabib al-Shakiri.

He was a memorizer of hadiths and transmitted hadiths from Ali ibn Abi Talib.

Companion of Husayn ibn Ali 
He and Abis ibn Abi Shabib al-Shakiri delivered the letter of Muslim ibn Aqil from Kufa to Husayn in Mecca and accompanied him from Mecca to Karbala.

On the Day of Ashura 
Abis ibn Abi Shabib al-Shakiri came to Shawdhab, who was his relative, and said, “What is your heart’s desire”? He replied, “What do I desire? I desire to fight alongside you, while defending the grandson of the Prophet of Allah, until I am martyred.” Abis replied, "and nothing else was expected from you. If I had anyone dearer than you today, I would send him to the battlefield before I would go."

He was martyred in the afternoon of Ashura after Hanzala ibn As'ad al-Shibami.

References 

Husayn ibn Ali
Hussainiya
680 deaths
People killed at the Battle of Karbala